Andrey Anatolyevich Satsunkevich (born 18 March 1966) is a Belarusian professional football coach and a former player. Since 2008 he works as a goalkeeper coach in Belarus national football team.

Club career
He made his professional debut in the Soviet Top League in 1987 for FC Dinamo Minsk.

Honours
Dinamo Minsk
 Belarusian Premier League champion: 1992, 1992–93, 1993–94
 Belarusian Cup winner: 1992, 1993–94

References

1966 births
Footballers from Minsk
Living people
Soviet footballers
Belarusian footballers
Association football goalkeepers
Belarus international footballers
FC Dinamo Minsk players
FC Torpedo Moscow players
FC Torpedo-2 players
FC Lokomotiv Nizhny Novgorod players
Soviet Top League players
Belarusian Premier League players
Russian Premier League players
Belarusian expatriate footballers
Expatriate footballers in Russia
Belarusian football managers